The 2007 AFC Futsal Championship qualification was held in March 2007 to determine 4 spots to the final tournament in Japan. The top 11 teams of the 2006 AFC Futsal Championship, and the host nation for the 2007 competition, receive automatic byes to Finals.

Groups

Group A

Group B

Qualifiers

Host nation

2006 tournament

Qualification

References

 Results

AFC Futsal Championship qualification
Afc Futsal Championship Qualification, 2007
International futsal competitions hosted by Taiwan